Nawngwao is a village in Mu Se Township, Mu Se District, northern Shan State.

Geography
Nawngwao lies in a valley, 1 km northeast of Longkam.

Further reading
 Map - Districts of Shan (North) State

References

Populated places in Shan State
China–Myanmar border